Oceans and Deserts is Gang Gajang's fourth and final studio album.  It was released on the independent Shock label in October 2002.

Track listing 

All tracks written by Mark Callaghan unless otherwise indicated.

 "Nomadsland" (Robert James)
 "Time (and The Mandelbrot Set)"
 "Anodyne Dream"
 "Carioca Girl" (Callaghan, James)
 "These Years" (Callaghan, James)
 "I Will"
 "Waiting in the Wind" (James)
 "Let It Go" (Callaghan, Graham Bidstrup)
 "Trust" (Callaghan, James, Geoff Stapleton, Bidstrup, Chris Bailey)
 "Camp of the Moon" (James)
 "Pill for the Pain"

Additional backing vocals on Tracks 5, 6, 7, 8, and 9 were provided by original members Kayellen Bee and Marilyn Sommer (aka Marilyn Delaney).

References

2002 albums
Gang Gajang albums